Westfield Fire Headquarters is located in Westfield, Union County, New Jersey, United States. The firehouse was built in 1911 and added to the National Register of Historic Places on December 8, 1980.

See also
National Register of Historic Places listings in Union County, New Jersey

References

Buildings and structures in Union County, New Jersey
Fire stations on the National Register of Historic Places in New Jersey
Fire stations completed in 1911
Italianate architecture in New Jersey
National Register of Historic Places in Union County, New Jersey
Westfield, New Jersey
1911 establishments in New Jersey
New Jersey Register of Historic Places